Bryan Davis (born 1981 in Monterey, California) is an American inventor and distiller.  He is most noteworthy for inventing and patenting the first process documented to successfully replicate some of the effects of barrel ageing of distilled spirits in a laboratory (the Davis method). He is the founder of Lost Spirits an award-winning distilled spirits manufacturing company which uses the technology to manufacture its products as well as license the technology to third parties.

In 2015, The Spirits Business presented Davis with the Global Master award for innovation.

As of 2016, the Davis method of aging spirits is only used by a handful of producers.  However, it has been widely speculated that Davis' invention may ultimately revolutionize the spirits industry.

Products made using Davis' technology have been named the "best spirits of 2015" by Serious Eats, and "best spirits of 2014" by liquor.com. Rum made using the technology won "best in class" at the Miami Rum Renaissance blind judging in 2014. Additionally, his company, was nominated for Craft Distillery of the Year in 2014 by Whisky Magazine.

Education 
Bryan Davis is a notable autodidact.  He has a Bachelor of fine Arts degree from The San Francisco Art Institute, yet was able to master organic chemistry sufficiently well to make a breakthrough in the industry, primarily reading pubmed and Wikipedia.

Career 
Davis was the co-founder and distiller of Obsello Absinthe, and Port of Dragons gin before founding Lost Spirits in 2010.

Notes

External links 
 
 Wired Magazine
 Huffington Post

Living people
1981 births
American technology company founders
San Francisco Art Institute alumni
Businesspeople from the San Francisco Bay Area
People from Monterey, California
21st-century American inventors